Rodrigo Fernandez-Stoll is a Canadian actor and comedian. He was a dual Canadian Screen Award nominee at the 8th Canadian Screen Awards in 2020, receiving nods for Best Lead Performance in a Web Program or Series for Save Me and Best Supporting Performance in a Web Program or Series for How to Buy a Baby.

He had a recurring role in Kim's Convenience as Enrique, a regular customer of the convenience store, and has a regular supporting role in Detention Adventure.

His short film Job Interview won the Canadian Comedy Award for Best Comedy Special or Short Film at the 16th Canadian Comedy Awards in 2015.

Filmography

Film

Television

References

External links

Living people
21st-century Canadian male actors
Canadian male television actors
Canadian male film actors
Canadian male web series actors
Canadian male comedians
Canadian stand-up comedians
Canadian Comedy Award winners
Year of birth missing (living people)